Vitreobalcis is a genus of very small ectoparasitic sea snails, marine gastropod mollusks or micromollusks in   the Eulimidae family.

Species
Species within the genus Vitreobalcisinclude :
 Vitreobalcis holdsworthi (H. Adams, 1874)
 Vitreobalcis laevis Warén, 1980
 Vitreobalcis nutans (Mühlfeld, 1824)

References

 Warén A. (1980) Descriptions of new taxa of Eulimidae (Mollusca, Prosobranchia), with notes on some previously described genera. Zoologica Scripta 9: 283-306

Eulimidae